Henry Earl Sinks (January 1, 1940 – May 13, 2017), known professionally as Earl Sinks, was an American singer-songwriter and actor, known by many pseudonyms. He led a prolific musical and acting career from the 1950s to the 1990s before retiring. He was best known for his long music career, including his brief tenure as lead singer of the Crickets from 1958 to 1960, and for his acting roles in numerous low budget movies and TV shows in the 60s.

Music career
Sinks was performing with Bob Wills at age 12 before doing his first recordings in 1958 at Norman Petty Studios as a solo artist. Under the alias of "Earl Henry" he had 2 singles "I Am The Man/Whatcha Gonna Do?" and "My Suzanne/Believe A Traveler" on Dot Records. After Buddy Holly split with The Crickets near the end of 1958, Sinks was brought in by Norman Petty to record. He recorded and performed with the Crickets after Holly's death in 1959, contributing to the album In Style With the Crickets, singing on songs such as "I Fought the Law," "Love's Made a Fool of You",  "Deborah",  and "When You Ask About Love". Sinks' association with the Crickets ended in February 1960, citing a disagreement. David Box was later brought in to finish recording and fulfill the band's contract with Coral Records.

Sinks later moved to Nashville, where he continued to release records.  He recorded for Decca Records, in addition to Hickory, Capitol, Coral, Brunswick, United Artist, Warner Brothers and Ace of Hearts Records. He and Norro Wilson, along with Bill Fernez, recorded as the band the Omegas [country music]. In October 1958 Tommy Allsup rejoined the Crickets for the "Biggest Show of Stars: Autumn Edition”, after Buddy split from Jerry Allison and Joe Mauldin. The Roses (a vocal backup group)  were also on the tour. Needing a new band for the planned “Winter Dance Party Tour”, Buddy asked his pal Waylon Jennings to play bass, with Tommy on guitar and Allsup's pal Carl Bunch for drums. After the tragedy, Tommy Allsup and Earl remained in New York following the end of the “Winter Dance Party Tour” for promotional pictures with J.I. and Joe B. as The Crickets.

Sinks had recorded earlier with the Crickets, along with Sonny Curtis, and sang lead on their version of "I Fought the Law,” “Someone Someone,” and “Loves Made A Fool of You." In 1959 he came to Nashville with his pal Bob Montgomery, where they worked together as songwriters with Acuff-Rose. He recorded under the names of Earl Sinks, Sinx Mitchell, Earl Richards and Earl "Snake" Richards. He wrote songs for artists such as Sue Thompson, the Everly Brothers, the Newbeats, Ernie Ashworth, Brenda Lee, Roy Orbison, Mel Tillis, as well as the Crickets and Buddy Holly.
He would either play guitar or sing harmony over a majority of the sessions with artists such as Mel Tillis, Del Reeves, Mel Street, Charlie Pride, etc.

Acting
When Nashville filmmaker Ron Ormond started looking for a star for his low-budget films in the mid-1960s, he asked Smiley Wilson (artist and booking agent), and Smiley recommended his son-in-law Earl. At this time, Earl was recording for the Warner Brothers record label as well as appearing in some of the Warner Brothers television shows, such as Cheyenne, Sugarfoot, and Surfside Six. In his first Ormond film, Girl From Tobacco Row, Sinks found himself with a nickname. When talking with Ken Beck of the Tennessean newspaper he said "Ron gave me that name", and from then on, all the jocks (deejays) started calling him Snake Richards.  Along with Girl From Tobacco Row,  Ormond's film White Lightnin' Road also included Earl as "Snake" and also later in the 20th Century Fox film by Richard Ball That Tennessee Beat.

Later life
By the 1970s Sinks was tuned in more to the business end of things and ran Ace of Hearts Records and acted also as producer. Over the years he produced artists such as John Anderson, Faron Young, Joyce Cobb, Jimmy Dickens, Porter Wagoner, Mark Dinning, The Remingtons, Bobby Lewis, Mel Street and many more.  

According to the Nashville Tennessean, "Snake" lived with his wife, once known as Little Rita Faye on the Grand Ole Opry and the daughter of country stars Smiley and Kitty Wilson. They were married for over 50 years and lived in Goodlettsville, where wife, Rita, still resides and their son Brandon Earl Sinks keeps the music tradition going.

Earl Sinks died at his home on May 13, 2017.

Discography

Solo
Studio Albums
The Sun Is Shining (On Everybody But Me) (1970) 5
Singles
"Whatcha Gonna Do?" / "I Am The Man" (1958) 1
"My Suzanne" / "Believe A Traveller" (1958) 1
"Look For Me (I'll Be There)" / "Super Market" (1961) 2
"Little Susie Parker" / "Superstitious" (1961) 2
"Be Good" / "A Little Bit Of Heaven" (1962) 3
"Looking For Love" / "Raining On My Side of Town" (1963) 3
"Love Is All I'm Asking For" / "This Weird Sensation" (1964) 4
"The Language Of Love" / "Return To Thunder Road" (1965) 3
"Maggie" / "Shake 'Em Up And Let 'Em Roll" (1968) 5
"The House Of Blue Lights" / "Hard Times A Comin'" (1969) 5
"Corrine, Corrina" / "Climbing A Mountain" (1969) 5
"What You Gonna Do, Leroy?" / "Can't Live Down The Lovin'" (1970) 5
"Sunshine" / "San Francisco Mabel Joy" (1970) 5
"Baby I Need Your Lovin" / "Our House On Paper" (1971) 5
"You Were Crying" / "You Drove Her Right Into My Arms" (1971) 5
"Down Along The Cove" / "Let It Be" (1972) 5
"Margie, Who's Watching The Baby?" / "My Land" (1972) 5
"Things Are Kinda Slow At The House" / "Do My Playing At Home" (1973) 5
"The Sun Is Shining (On Everybody But Me)" / "Mother Nature's Daughter" (1973) 5
"How Can I Tell Her" / "Walkin' In Teardrops" (1973) 5
"Julianne" / "House of Blue Lights" (1977) 5
Compilations
Earl Richards (1976) 5
House of Blue Lights (1977) 5
The Man With 1000 Names a.k.a. After School Sessions 3

The Crickets
Studio Albums
In Style With the Crickets (1960)
Singles / EP's
"Love's Made a Fool of You" / "Someone, Someone" (1959)
"When You Ask About Love" / "Deborah" (1959)
The Crickets (1960)
"A Sweet Love" / "I Fought the Law" (1961)

The Omegas
Singles
"Froze" / "When You Touch Me" (1959)
"Study Hall" / " So How Come (No One Loves Me)" (1960)
"Failing in Love" / "No One Will Ever Know" (1960)

The Mar-Vels
Singles
"Then I'll Cry" / "Lookin' At The Ceiling" (1966)

Other appearances
Rockin' Rollin' High School Vol. 1 (1980)
Rockin' Rollin' High School Vol. 2 (1980)
The Clovis Sessions – Vol. 1 (1984)
Study Hall (2013)

1 Released as Earl Henry.
2 Released as Earl Sink.
3 Released as Earl Sinks.
4 Released as Sinx Mitchell.
5 Released as Earl Richards.

References

1940 births
2017 deaths
20th-century American singers
American male film actors
People from Hockley County, Texas
Singer-songwriters from Texas
People from Goodlettsville, Tennessee